Zangian (also Romanized as Zangīān, Zangeyān, and Zangiyan) is a village in Khatunabad Rural District, in the Central District of Jiroft County, Kerman Province, Iran. At the 2006 census, its population was 627, in 134 families.

References 

Populated places in Jiroft County